Ministry of Mining may refer to:

 Ministry of Mining (Chile)
 Ministry of Mining (Kenya)
 Ministry of Mining (Tanzania)

See also
 Ministry of Mines (disambiguation)